Ouvrage Col de Restefond is a lesser work (petit ouvrage) of the Maginot Line's Alpine extension, the Alpine Line. The ouvrage consists of three infantry blocks. Construction work was completed in 1934, but the ouvrage was not armed until 1938.

Description
See Fortified Sector of the Dauphiné for a broader discussion of the Dauphiné sector of the Alpine Line.
Block 1 (entry): one machine gun cloche and one heavy twin machine gun embrasure.
Block 2 (south entry): one machine gun embrasure.
Block 3 (south entry): one machine gun cloche and one heavy twin machine gun embrasure.

See also
 List of Alpine Line ouvrages

References

Bibliography 
Allcorn, William. The Maginot Line 1928-45. Oxford: Osprey Publishing, 2003. 
Kaufmann, J.E. and Kaufmann, H.W. Fortress France: The Maginot Line and French Defenses in World War II, Stackpole Books, 2006. 
Kaufmann, J.E., Kaufmann, H.W., Jancovič-Potočnik, A. and Lang, P. The Maginot Line: History and Guide, Pen and Sword, 2011. 
Mary, Jean-Yves; Hohnadel, Alain; Sicard, Jacques. Hommes et Ouvrages de la Ligne Maginot, Tome 1. Paris, Histoire & Collections, 2001.  
Mary, Jean-Yves; Hohnadel, Alain; Sicard, Jacques. Hommes et Ouvrages de la Ligne Maginot, Tome 4 - La fortification alpine. Paris, Histoire & Collections, 2009.  
Mary, Jean-Yves; Hohnadel, Alain; Sicard, Jacques. Hommes et Ouvrages de la Ligne Maginot, Tome 5. Paris, Histoire & Collections, 2009.

External links 
 Restefond (petit ouvrage du col de) at fortiff.be 

COLR
Maginot Line
Alpine Line